Givat Shapira (lit. Shapiro Hill) is a moshav in central Israel. Located in the Sharon plain near Netanya, it falls under the jurisdiction of Hefer Valley Regional Council.

History
The moshav was founded in 1958 and was named in honour of Zvi Hermann Schapira, the man who suggested the establishment of the Jewish National Fund.

References

Moshavim
Agricultural Union
Populated places established in 1958
1958 establishments in Israel
Populated places in Central District (Israel)